Two Men and a Wardrobe (1958) is a short Polish black and white silent movie directed by Roman Polański.

Plot 
The film features two men, played by Jakub Goldberg and Henryk Kluba, who emerge from the sea carrying a large wardrobe, which they proceed to carry into a town. Carrying the wardrobe, the two encounter a series of hostile events, including being attacked by a group of youths (one of whom is played by Polanski himself). Finally, they arrive back at a beach and then disappear in the sea.

References

External links
View Two Men and a Wardrobe at dailymotion.com

1958 films
1958 short films
Fictional duos
Films directed by Roman Polanski
Films scored by Krzysztof Komeda
Films with screenplays by Roman Polanski
Polish silent short films